Badia Tedalda is a comune (municipality) in the Province of Arezzo in the Italian region Tuscany, located about  east of Florence and about  northeast of Arezzo. Two of its frazioni, Santa Sofia Marecchia and Cicognaia, form an exclave of the province of Arezzo (Ca' Raffaello) surrounded by the Province of Rimini, Emilia-Romagna region.

References

External links

Cities and towns in Tuscany